The Trail of the Octopus is a 1919 American mystery film serial directed by Duke Worne. A print of The Trail of the Octopus which is missing episode 9 is in the Library of Congress. The surviving film serial has been released on DVD.

Plot 
An expedition to Egypt led by Dr. Stanhope discovers the ancient Tomb of Death, in which is hidden the supposedly cursed Sacred Talisman of Set, also called "The Devil's Trademark". While Dr. Stanhope and his companion are retrieving the Talisman, the expedition is attacked by desert brigands. Dr. Stanhope's companion suddenly attacks him and in the fight Stanhope kills him. but the dying man reveals that he had been sent to kill Stanhope and get the Talisman for "The Sacred Twelve". Years after his return home, Stanhope, who now lives in a state of constant fear, tells his daughter Ruth the story and warns her about the danger they are in. Stanhope tells Ruth that he has hidden the Talisman in a rock vault, which can only be opened by a combination of nine oriental daggers, one of which he has and the other eight being in the possession of fellow scientists, but before he can reveal the names of the other eight a telephone call tells him that one of the scientists has been murdered and that he will be next. Ruth calls upon her boyfriend master criminologist Carter Holmes for help, and they return to the Stanhope home only to find Dr. Stanhope dead. Now Carter and Ruth must track down the remaining seven scientists and their daggers before The Sacred Twelve, led by the mysterious masked man Monsieur X, can find them and use the daggers to recover the Talisman of Set.

Cast
 Ben F. Wilson as Carter Holmes
 Neva Gerber as Ruth Stanhope
 William Dyer as Sandy MacNab
 Howard Crampton as Dr. Reid Stanhope
 William A. Carroll as Omar
 Marie Pavis as Mlle. Zora Rularde
 Al Ernest Garcia (as Allen Garcia) as Jan Al-Kasim
 Al Ernest Garcia (as E(a)rnest Garcia) as Wang Foo

Chapter titles
The Devil's Trademark (3 reels)
Purple Dagger
Face to Face
The Hand of Wang
The Eye of Satan
Behind the Mask
The Dance of Death
Satan's Soulmate
The Chained Soul
The Ape Man
The Red Death
The Poisoned Talon
The Phantom Mandarin
The House of Shadows
The Yellow Octopus

See also
 List of film serials
 List of film serials by studio

References

External links

1919 films
1919 drama films
1910s independent films
1910s mystery drama films
American mystery drama films
American silent serial films
American black-and-white films
American independent films
Films directed by Duke Worne
1910s American films
Silent American drama films
Silent mystery drama films
1910s English-language films